Ali Seezan (born 6 February 1977) is a Maldivian film actor, editor, director and producer. He has established a career in Maldives Film Industry and is a recipient of two National Film Awards.

Early life
Ali Seezan was born on 6 February 1977. His parents Fathimath Waheeda and Abdul Rasheed are not active members of the film industry, though his father has worked in arranging stage shows for many events. He completed his studies at Madhrasathul Ameer Ahmed and Majeediyya School. He is a nephew of Maldivian actor and politician Reeko Moosa Manik. While studying he was an active participant in Scout and Cadet activities. During his early years, he found little interest to pursue a career in the industry, though he used to make videos at home for enjoyment.

Career

1997–2009: Debut and early work
Seezan's first work in the industry came as an assistant director in the film Maazee (1997) and he remained working behind the camera for over a year. It was then he decided to pursue a career in the film industry. With the help of actress Mariyam Nazima—a classmate of his elder sister—he first appeared in a video spot made to mark the 200th episode of Heyyambo (1998). He later appeared in three songs; first of them being the "Neena" which was sung by Abdul Hannan Moosa Didi. Seezan committed to acting professionally, with a supporting role in the Easa Sahreef—directed 2000 Vana Ufan Dhuvas (2000). Though Seezan mark his debut film with 2000 Vana Ufan Dhuvas, he started acting for Slam Studio's Ekaniveriya, which was released much later. In the former, he played the role of Latheef, a suspicious friend who dies while trying to save his best-friend. He next starred alongside Mariyam Nazima and Yoosuf Shafeeu as the handicapped artist who fails to fulfill his duties as a husband due to his physical incapability, in Mohamed Rasheed's Hithu Vindhu (2000).

In 2001, Seezan received much acclaim for his role in Aishath Ali Manik's Hiiy Edhenee (2001) which was an unofficial remake of Dharmesh Darshan's romantic film Dhadkan (2000) starring Akshay Kumar, Suniel Shetty and Shilpa Shetty in the lead role. Cast opposite Sheela Najeeb and Asad Shareef, Seezan played the role of Vishal Amir, a religious-minded man with great ideals, who believes in giving a rightful place to his wife and respects her sensibilities. The film proved to be a breakthrough for Seezan, while he received the Best Actor award at the 3rd Gaumee Film Awards ceremony.

Seezan collaborated with Easa Shareef for a horror film Ginihila (2003) alongside Mariyam Nisha, Niuma Mohamed and Reeko Moosa Manik, playing the role of Mifzal Amir, the reticent husband who hid the truth of his extramarital affair with a psychopath girl. The film narrates the story of a young couple who decided to spend a romantic break to save their crumbling marriage and how events take a sinister turn when the wife experiences supernatural incidence which has her husband involvement in it. The film is an unofficial remake of Vikram Bhatt's Indian horror film Raaz (2002) featuring Bipasha Basu, Dino Morea, Malini Sharma and Ashutosh Rana which itself is an unofficial adaptation of What Lies Beneath. It was followed by Abdul Faththaah-directed Aan... Aharenves Loabivin (2002) starred alongside Sheela Najeeb, Niuma Mohamed, Aminath Rasheedha and Neena Saleem where he played the role of Jina, a photograph who was forced to fake a relationship to help his ex-lover suffering from amnesia. Upon release, the film opened to positive response from critics and was a commercially successful project.

In 2005, Seezan starred alongside Niuma Mohamed and Sheereen Abdul Wahid in Ahmed Nimal's horror film Handhu Keytha (2005) which unfolds the story of a man who was enchanted by a spirit while witnessing a lunar eclipse. In the film, he played the unfaithful boyfriend who has been possessed by the spirit. He collaborated with Fathimath Nahula for the first time in her critically and commercially successful romantic drama television series, Kalaage Haqqugaa (2005), to portray the role of Hassan, the elder brother from a non-identical twins who dies when the boat he was travelling capsizes into the sea. He then repeated his collaboration with Fathimath Nahula for another critically appreciated and commercially prosperous project, a romantic drama film Zuleykha (2005) which narrates the journey of a nine years old girl seeking the lost love of her mother. Featuring an ensemble cast including Yoosuf Shafeeu, Mariyam Nisha, Sheela Najeeb, Mohamed Manik and Mariyam Enash Sinan, Seezan played the role of a doctor who sympathizes for a vulnerable patient which fetched him a Gaumee Film Award for Best Supporting Actor. Thirty three houseful shows of the film were screened at the cinema making it the highest grossing Maldivian release of the year.

Ahmed Nimal-directed erotic horror thriller Khalaas was released in 2008 which follows a newly married couple who relocate themselves to Sri Lanka. Starring opposite Mariyam Afeefa and Nadhiya Hassan, Seezan played the role of Fayaa, a perfidious husband who is unwillingly seduced by woman who is later revealed to be dead. The film received mixed reviews from critics specific appraisal being subjected to its bold and erotic theme. The song "Haadha Dhahivethi Belumekey"–performed by Seezan alongside Mariyam Unoosha–from the film fetched him the Best Choreographer award at 1st Maldives Film Awards. The following year, he directed the melodrama Karuna Vee Beyvafa (2009) starred opposite Niuma and Nadhiya Hassan as the confused husband. The film follows a downfall of a happily married couple on realizing the wife's infertility and destruction of their relationship with the invasion of a second wife.

2010–12: Commercial success
Seezan's first release of 2010 was Abdul Fahtah's horror film Jinni alongside Mariyam Afeefa. Based on a true stories that occurred in an island of Maldives, Seezan played the role of Javid, who falls in love with a girl and unknowingly dates a ghost shaped by his lover. Prior to release the film was marketed to be full of suspense and unique compared to other mediocre Maldivian horror films. Upon release, the film received mixed reviews from critics; majority of them complaining for having the "same old feeling" of prior horror flicks though the performance were noted to be satisfactory. Despite the mixed reviews, the film witnessed a positive response at the box office, screening a total of twenty two housefull shows in Male'. At the 2nd Maldives Film Awards, Seezan received a nomination for the Best Actor category. He next appeared in the family drama Maafeh Neiy alongside Niuma Mohamed, which was directed and produced by himself. The film highlights many social issues including human rights abuses, forced marriages and domestic violence. He played the role of Nawaal who is killed by necromancy for marrying a woman out of her parents' consent. The film received mixed reviews from critics, majority of them dismissing its melodrama and was a moderate success at box office. The film was nominated as the Best film at 2nd Maldives Film Awards.

In the next release of year, a family drama by Ali Shifau, Dhin Veynuge Hithaamaigaa (2010) Seezan featured in the villainous role Fairooz, an impudent manager who seeks vengeance for his father's dismissal from the company. The film showcases discrimination against the islanders, family revenge and fatherhood responsibilities. The film received positive response from critics, his performance specifically being applauded: "The scenes that made the villainous Fairooz more nefarious, with the relevant background music included, were probably the best of their kind shown". The film was believed to be a "huge improvement" over the recent Maldivian films. Being able to screen fifteen housefull shows of the film, it was declared to be a commercial success. For the role, he won the Best Supporting Actor award at the 2nd Maldives Film Awards and received a nomination for the Best Supporting Actor award at the 6th Gaumee Film Awards. He next reunited with Niuma Mohamed and Ravee Farooq in Amjad Ibrahim's romantic horror film Vakinuvinama which was a critical and commercial failure.

In 2011, Seezan featured in Ali Shifau's psychological romantic thriller Zaharu alongside Niuma Mohamed and Sheela Najeeb. The film centers on a married man who has a weekend affair with a woman who refuses to allow it to end and becomes obsessed with him. He played the role of Hussain, an interior designer who has an extramarital affair with a long lost friend. The film is inspired from Adrian Lyne-directed American psychological erotic thriller film Fatal Attraction (1987). Upon release the film received mixed response from critics and was declared a "flop" at box office. He then starred opposite Aishath Rishmy and Mariyam Nisha, in Abdul Faththaah-directed 14 Vileyrey. Written by Ibrahim Waheed, the project faced controversy when the team of Kuhveriakee Kaakuhey? accuses Fatthah for "purloining the plot" of the latter. The film and his performance received mixed to positive reviews from critics; "Seezan handles the aggressive parts as well as the depression sequences with ease". The film did good business at box office and was declared a "Hit".

His next release was a war action comedy film Wathan which is directed, written, edited and produced by himself. Upon release the film received negative response from critics. Haveeru Daily felt the film "deceived" the audience in the name of action thriller; "I highly doubt if the project team was even sure of what kind of movie they were planning to make. It is a total mess between a serious action movie and scoop comedy". The film was further criticed for remaking several shots from Jim Abrahams's parody film, Hot Shots! Part Deux (1993). Seezan's last release of the year was Ahmed Azmeel's debut direction Hiyy Yaara Dheefa (2011), starred alongside Aishath Rishmy, Niuma Mohamed, Ahmed Azmeel and Aminath Rasheedha. The film received negative reviews from critics pointing similarities between Bollywood comedy-drama film Ishq (1997) and Kundan Shah's family drama Dil Hai Tumhaara (2002). He played Isham, a poor boy who falls in love with a rich girl. The film did not succeed financially, but his portrayal was moderately acclaimed by critics.

In 2012, Seezan starred in Ravee Farooq-directed romantic drama film Mihashin Furaana Dhandhen opposite Niuma Mohamed. Upon release, the film received mixed response from critics while his performance was recognised positively. Ahmed Nadheem of Haveeru noted the film as "the best Maldivian melodramatic film" he had seen in the past two years, though displeased with its similarities between two Bollywood films. It was followed by Abdul Faththaah's romantic film Love Story alongside Amira Ismail and Aishath Rishmy. He played Althaf Shair who falls in love with the island chief's daughter. The film and his performance received negative response from critics. Nadheem credited his role in the film to be "exact replica" of what he has portrayed in his previous release, Mihashin Furaana Dhandhen. Displeased with the screenplay and performance of the actors, he wrote: "None of the actors were given scope to build their characters and none was able to justify their character. With excessive emotional scenes, actors were exposed to over-acting and nothing more". He further noted that Seezan's performance kept steeping low as the weightage of his role progressed.

2014–present: Further production ventures
In 2014, Seezan starred opposite Aishath Rishmy in his directorial venture, psychological thriller Insaana, playing the timid and weak-minded man who murders his wife. It revolves around a murderer who tries to evade from the guilt after crime. Made on a budget of MVR 220,000, the film was inspired by Ryan Connolly's short psychological horror film Tell (2012) which is loosely based on the Edgar Allan Poe short story "The Tell-Tale Heart". Upon release, the film received widespread critical acclaim. Hassan Naail from Vaguthu called it "one of the best Maldivian release till date" and wrote; "There isn't a specific scene which can be pointed out bad. His performance in the film can be termed as his career best performance". At the 2015 South Asian Association for Regional Cooperation Film Festival, Insaana was bestowed with Bronze Medal as Best Film, competing with seventeen regional films.

The following year, Seezan released his first film under the banner S. Productions, which is owned by himself. Titled Ahsham, the film was made on a budget of MVR 1,500,000, hence was considered to be the most expensive film made in the film industry. Though the film and his portrayal of the title character received mixed to positive response from critics, his effort in direction was positively received by critics. Ahmed Nadheem from Avas, applauded the hard work and continuous effort brought while producing the film, and for making a film on the genre which Maldivian audience is not quite familiar with. It was one of the three entries from Maldives to the SAARC Film Festival 2016. At the 8th Gaumee Film Awards Seezan received six nominations including, Best Actor and Best Director, Best Editing, Best Art Direction and Best Costume Design.

In 2016, Seezan's first release was Ahmed Nimal-directed horror film E Re'ah Fahu. Upon release, the film received negative response from critics and was declared a flop. His next release was the romantic film Vafaatheri Kehiveriya, which was directed by himself. The film received mixed to negative reception from critics. Ahmed Nadheem from Avas blamed the title of the film for giving the impression of "old typical" taste to the film. However, his portrayal of the character Fayaa was considered as an "overall good" performance.

He next featured alongside an ensemble cast including Yoosuf Shafeeu, Mohamed Manik, Ahmed Saeed and Fathimath Azifa in the romantic comedy film Naughty 40 (2017) which was directed by Shafeeu. The film revolves around three friends, Ashwanee, Ahsan and Ajwad (Played by Shafeeu, Saeed and Manik respectively) who are single and having a youthful outlook, in spite of being in their forties. The film met with both critical and commercial success, emerging as one of the highest grossing Maldivian films of 2017. He reprised the role in the horror comedy film 40+ (2019), a sequel to 2017 released comedy film Naughty 40, which was well received both critically and commercially.

Media image
In 2011, Seezan was selected in the top five as the "Most Entertaining Actor" in the SunFM Awards 2010, an award night ceremony initiated by Sun Media Group to honour the most recognized personalities in different fields, during the previous year. In 2018, he was ranked in the third position from Dho?'s list of Top Ten Actor of Maldives.

Filmography

Feature film

Television

Short film

Other work

Discography

Feature film

Non-Film songs

Accolades

References 

1977 births
Living people
People from Malé
21st-century Maldivian male actors
Maldivian male film actors
Maldivian film directors